2022 NBA season may refer to:

2021–22 NBA season
2022–23 NBA season